Ist der Ruf erst ruiniert... is the third studio album by German all-female pop-rap band Tic Tac Toe, released in 2000 by RCA Records. The title comes from a German proverb "Ist der Ruf erst ruiniert, lebt es sich ganz ungeniert" which means "Once the reputation is ruined, you can live completely free". The material was again composed and produced by Torsten Börger.

The album was released after the original member Ricarda "Ricky" Wältken left the band amid controversies and conflicts with other bandmates, being subsequently replaced by Sara Brahms. It spawned three singles, of which only one, "Isch liebe disch", achieved moderate chart success internationally. The album did not sell as well as its predecessors and one year after its release the band entered a hiatus.

Track listing

Charts

References 

2000 albums
German-language albums
Tic Tac Toe (band) albums